Old NH-37 is now National Highway 127.  It's a national highway of India. It connects Nagaon, New Gatanga and Jakhalabandha in the state of Assam.

Route 
National Highway 127 connects Mainly Nagaon District's Uriagaon, Puranigudam, Samaguri,New Gatanga, Rangagorah, Amoni, Missa, Kaliabor Tiniali, Kuwaritol and Jakhalabandha Town. This road under as Asian Highway 1 (AH-1) and Assam Trunk Road (AT Road)

New Gatanga Highway 

New Gatanga Highway is a Main Road of New Gatanga. New Gatanga Highway also Known as New Gatanga Road. New Gatanga Highway is under AT Road, NH-127, AH-1. This road Total Length 2.5 KM. New Gatanga Highway Located in New Gatanga. This is a complete  4 Lane High Speed Road. This Road Start Point is New Gatanga West Crossing and End Point is New Gatanga Educational Hub, New Gatanga East Crossing.

New Gatanga 

New Gatanga is a Village of Nagaon District. New Gatanga Located New Gatanga Highway. New Gatanga old name is Gotonga. National Highway 127 (New Gatanga Highway) & Kolong River Passes through the center of New Gatanga Village. New Gatanga Famous for Gatanga Temple Naam Kirtan Festival & Shitala Puja & Mela. New Gatanga also Known as Temple City. New Gatanga famous Building Landmark is: Gatanga Shopping Complex- Building it's also located near New Gatanga Highway. New Gatanga Total Population is more than 3000. New Gatanga is Now Developed Industries, Educational Sectors, Highway Connectivity & more. New Gatanga also have many fisheries like: Gatanga Beel , Gatanga Fisheries Point,  Gatanga-Kuthani Beel etc. 
The Kolong River, A tributary of Brahmaputra River flows through in the New Gatanga and in the process divided the into two distinct region: New Gatanga and Chokitup.

New Gatanga Divided in 4 Sectors: New Gatanga North, New Gatanga East, New Gatanga West, New Gatanga South 

North-  Kolong River, New Gatanga Highway, Gatanga Temple, Gatanga Shopping Complex- Building.

East- New Gatanga Visharjan Ghat, New Gatanga Engineering College, Food Craft Institute.

West- Gatanga Bengali LP School, New Dasgupta Market

South- Gatanga Fisheries.

References

2. New Gatanga Town Reference 

National highways in India
National Highways in Assam